is a Japanese track and field athlete. He competed in the men's pole vault at the 2000 Summer Olympics.

References

1974 births
Living people
Place of birth missing (living people)
Japanese male pole vaulters
Olympic male pole vaulters
Olympic athletes of Japan
Athletes (track and field) at the 2000 Summer Olympics
World Athletics Championships athletes for Japan
Japan Championships in Athletics winners